The AGO C.III was a German reconnaissance biplane of World War I. It was a single experimental prototype derived from the manufacturer's C.I design.

Specifications

References

 
 Das Virtuelle Luftfahrtmuseum

AGO C.03
Single-engined pusher aircraft
Aircraft first flown in 1916
C.III